The Eastside Transit Corridor is a light rail line extension that currently connects Downtown Los Angeles with East Los Angeles. However, the extension is planned to extend further southeast to connect with the Gateway Cities, continuing from a relocated Atlantic station southeast to a new Lambert station in Whittier.

The extension is planned to become part of the Los Angeles Metro Rail A Line north of the Regional Connector and the E Line south of it. The entire line is currently part of the L Line.

Phase 1
Following a new right-of-way, Phase 1 of the Eastside Transit Corridor extended the L Line (then known as the Gold Line) southeast from Union Station to Atlantic station in East Los Angeles. It opened on November 15, 2009.

Overview of Phase 2
The Los Angeles County Metropolitan Transportation Authority (Metro) has studied two alternative alignments for this extension. In 2015, Metro estimated the cost of both alignments of what was then known as the Gold Line Eastside Rail Extension at $6.0 billion (to be delivered in 2057). The plan included in the Measure M transportation funding measure is to build improvements in stages. In 2009, Metro published the Eastside Transit Corridor Phase 2 Final Alternatives Analysis Report, and in 2014 published a Draft Environmental Impact Statement/Environmental Impact Report. In February 2020, the Metro Board voted to eliminate the SR 60 alignment and combined alignment alternatives from consideration, and proceed only with the Washington Boulevard alternative of the project. (The SR 60 line may be considered for construction in the future.) Construction is scheduled to begin in 2029, with public service by 2035, though the project's timeline may be accelerated under the Twenty-eight by '28 initiative.

Metro plans to merge the portion of the L Line east of Downtown Los Angeles into the E Line (which will then use the gold color instead of aqua on maps) upon completion of the Regional Connector in early 2023. This will allow a one-seat ride for travelers as far west as Santa Monica, with transfers to other lines at downtown stations.

In 2022, Metro recommended building the extension in phases — initially running as far as Greenwood Avenue in Montebello. Under the plan, the full extension would be studied to make way for the construction to Whittier when funds become available.

Proposed routings and modes of Phase 2
The Transit Corridor Project was originally proposed as a light rail route along Washington Boulevard. Metro studied three alternatives during its Initial Operating Study: along California State Route 60, the original concept to Whittier, and a project that built both routings. The combined routes would have served the communities of Montebello, Commerce, Pico Rivera, Monterey Park, South El Monte, South San Gabriel, Rosemead, Santa Fe Springs and Whittier in the east side of the county. All alternatives begin at the Gold Line's Atlantic Station and head east. 

Metro ruled out the SR 60 Freeway and combined alternative, leaving just the Washington Boulevard alternative for further consideration and study. A new maintenance yard is included as part of the extension.

During the Initial Operating Segment study, Metro concluded that Alternative 1 and 3 would interfere with future SR 60 expansions. Metro would have to buy some property and remove homes needed for a maintenance facility yard, as no large vacant lots were found. In February 2020, Metro staff recommended Alternative 2, removing the route along the SR 60 freeway (Alternative one) from further consideration, therefore also eliminating Alternative three in the process. Metro will focus on further studying and building the Washington Boulevard alternative.

Route selection: Alternative 2

References

External links 
 Eastside Transit Corridor Phase 2
 Measure R

Transportation in Los Angeles
Los Angeles County Metropolitan Transportation Authority
Los Angeles Metro Rail projects
Public transportation in Los Angeles
Public transportation in Los Angeles County, California
Proposed railway lines in California
2035 in rail transport